Raghunath Vithal Khedkar (born 1873 in Bombay) was an Indian surgeon. In 1959, he revised, enlarged, and published a historical work written by his father, Vithal Krishnaji Khedkar: The Divine Heritage of the Yadavas.

Khedkar studied medicine and surgery in the United Kingdom, at Edinburgh and Glasgow. He practised medicine in Newcastle-on-Tyne before returning to India at the start of World War I, and serving as a surgeon in Bombay, Kolhapur, and Nepal. Among the younger Khedkar's honors were membership in London's  Society of Tropical Medicine, and Hygiene and the Royal Sanitary Institute. In 1920, in response to the Southborough Committee, Khedkar campaigned for the recognition of the Yadav Gavlis as Marathas, arguing their descent from Krishna, maintenance of Kshatriya customs, and service in the Maratha regiments.

References

20th-century Indian medical doctors
20th-century Indian historians
1873 births
Year of death missing
Medical doctors from Mumbai
Indian surgeons
20th-century surgeons